The May Bumps 2013 were a set of rowing races at Cambridge University from Wednesday 12 June 2013 to Saturday 15 June 2013. The event was run as a bumps race and was the 122nd set of races in the series of May Bumps which have been held annually in mid-June in this form since 1887.

Head of the River crews

Highest 2nd VIIIs

  finished as the highest placed women's second VIII, finishing the week where they started as 5th overall in the W2 division.

Links to races in other years

Bumps Charts

Below are the bumps charts all 6 men's and all 4 women's divisions, with the men's event on the left and women's event on the right. The bumps chart represents the progress of every crew over all four days of the racing. To follow the progress of any particular crew, simply find the crew's name on the left side of the chart and follow the line to the end-of-the-week finishing position on the right of the chart.

Note that this chart may not be displayed correctly if you are using a large font size on your browser. A simple way to check is to see that the first horizontal bold line, marking the boundary between divisions, lies between positions 17 and 18. The combined Hughes Hall/Lucy Cavendish women's crews are listed as Lucy Cavendish only.

References

May Bumps
May Bumps results
May Bumps
May Bumps